Nikolaus Moser (born 21 March 1990) is a former Austrian tennis player. 

Along with Cedrik-Marcel Stebe he won the 2008 US Open – Boys' doubles title.

ATP Challenger and ITF Futures finals

Singles: 8 (4–4)

Doubles: 24 (15–9)

Junior Grand Slam finals

Doubles: 1 (1 title)

External links

1990 births
Living people
Austrian male tennis players
Tennis players from Vienna
US Open (tennis) junior champions
Grand Slam (tennis) champions in boys' doubles
21st-century Austrian people